Cora is the sixth studio album by indie rock band Cool Hand Luke. The album was funded exclusively by a Kickstarter campaign which raised $9,677 to release the songs.

References

Rock albums by American artists